McKinney is a surname. Notable people with the surname include:
Anthony McKinney, a convicted murderer in Illinois whose guilt has been questioned
Baylus Benjamin McKinney (1886–1952), American singer, songwriter, and music editor
Betsy McKinney, American politician and New Hampshire state Representative
Bevin McKinney, co-inventor of the Roton rocket
Bill McKinney (born 1931), American actor 
Billy McKinney (baseball) (born 1994), American baseball player
Billy McKinney (politician), American politician (and father of Cynthia McKinney)
Chance McKinney, American singer
Charlotte McKinney (born 1993), American model and actress
Chris McKinney (born 1973), American writer
Collin McKinney (1766–1861), American merchant and politician, an important figure in the Texas Revolution 
Cynthia McKinney (born 1955), American politician, Green Party nominee for president in 2008, and former United States Representative
D. Frank McKinney (1928–2001), British ornithologist and ethologist
Demetria McKinney (born 1981), American actress and songwriter
Dennis McKinney, former Kansas State Treasurer and Kansas state Representative
Fearghal McKinney (born 1962), Northern Irish television presenter and journalist
Florine McKinney (1909–1975), American actress
Frank McKinney (1938–1992), American swimmer
Frank E. McKinney (1904–1974), American banker and chair of the Democratic National Committee from 1951 to 1952
Gene C. McKinney (born 1950), American soldier
Hannah McKinney, American economist and politician
Irene McKinney, American poet and editor
Jack McKinney (basketball) (1935–2018), American basketball coach
Jack McKinney (writer), pseudonym used by American writers James Luceno and Brian Daley
Jeremy McKinney (born 1976), American football player
Jimmy McKinney (born 1983), American basketball player and film actor
Joe McKinney (born 1967), Irish actor
John F. McKinney, American politician and former United States Representative 
John R. McKinney (1921–1997), American soldier who received the Medal of Honor in World War II
Joseph Crescent McKinney (1928–2010), Roman Catholic bishop
Joyce McKinney (born 1949), alleged rapist in the Manacled Mormon case
Kennedy McKinney (born 1966), American boxer
Kurt McKinney (born 1962), American actor
Larry J. McKinney (1944–2017), American judge
Louise McKinney (1868–1931), Canadian politician 
Mark McKinney (born 1959), Canadian comedian and actor
Mary McKinney (1873–1987), American recognised as "the world's oldest person" at the time of her death
Mira McKinney (1892-1978), Film and Television actress
Nathaniel McKinney (born 1982), Bahamian athlete
Nina Mae McKinney (1913–1967), American actress
Philip W. McKinney (1832–1899), American politician 
Richard McKinney (born 1953), American archer and author 
Samuel McKinney (1807–1879), Irish-born Presbyterian minister in the American South
Seth McKinney (born 1979), American football player 
Steve McKinney (born 1975), American football player 
Stewart McKinney (politician) (1931–1987), American politician and former United States Representative
Tamara McKinney (born 1962), American alpine ski racer
Tom McKinney, Irish rugby league footballer
William McKinney (1895–1969), American jazz drummer
Xavier McKinney (born 1999), American football player

See also 
McKinnie, surname